Josiah Edward Spurr (1870–1950) was an American geologist, explorer, and author.
Born in Gloucester, Massachusetts, he was considered something of a failure as a youth, unsuited for the family fishing business, since on a voyage he invariably became seasick. Since he could not be a productive fisherman like his brothers, his parents decided he might as well go to college. After working his way through Harvard, he began his career with the Minnesota Geological Survey, making the first-ever geological map of the great Mesabi Range in Minnesota.

J. E. Spurr led two expeditions of historic importance in Alaska for the United States Geological Survey in 1896 and 1898, made without the benefit of telephones, airplanes, the internal combustion engine, or electrical appliances. In 1896 he led the first expedition to map and chart the interior of Alaska, exploring the Yukon Territory, where gold had been discovered. In 1898 Spurr went down the length of the Kuskokwim River, naming as he traveled previously undiscovered mountains, mountain ranges, creeks, rivers, lakes and glaciers.  At the end of the Kuskokwim expedition he made the first scientific observations of the Mount Katmai volcano, and the valley that later became known as the "Valley of Ten Thousand Smokes."  During these expeditions he encountered Native Americans, Aleuts, traders, missionaries, prospectors, whiskey smugglers and various con artists. His books were seen as the definitive work on Alaskan minerals during the Alaska Gold Rush. They read like an adventure including the expedition's experiences with ice dams bearing down on them and lost provisions, as well as interactions with native Indians and missionaries.

After charting these regions, Spurr became the world's leading geological consultant, working for clients including the Sultan of Turkey, Bernard Baruch, and the Guggenheims. He was generally regarded as one of the world's foremost geologists, and probably the leader in the field of economic geology (the application of geology to mining). At the age of 68 he became interested in the origin of craters of the moon, and published four books that made a major contribution to the field.  His last book, "Geology as applied to Selenology", published just a year before his death, has been criticised, but was influential in the new field. He was considered a superb and pithy writer.

He published well over a hundred articles in scientific journals, books and monographs, as well as poetry and books for a general audience. He has named after him, Mount Spurr, a very active volcano near Anchorage; Spurr crater on the moon; and a mineral, spurrite. Many of his papers, correspondence and photographs are in the American Heritage Center of the University of Wyoming; others are preserved in the Anchorage office of the United States Geological Survey.

His children were Edward "Ted" Spurr, an entrepreneur; John Spurr, a publishing executive; William Alfred Spurr, Professor of Statistics at Stanford; Robert A. Spurr, professor of chemistry at the University of Maryland; and Stephen H. Spurr, an authority on forestry and forest ecology and former president of the University of Texas at Austin.

There is a recent biography of him by Stephen J. Spurr, an economist who is his grandson.

Publications of Josiah Edward Spurr

1894     The iron-bearing rocks of the Mesabi range in Minnesota: Minnesota Geological and Natural History Survey, v. B10, 268 p., reviewed in XIV The American Geologist 251–252 (October 1894).

The iron ores of the Mesabi Range (Minnesota); American Geologist, v. 13, p. 335–345.

Preliminary report on field work done in 1893: Minnesota Geological and Natural History Survey, Annual Report 22, pp. 115–133.

The stratigraphic position of the Thomson slates (Minnesota), American Journal of Science, v. 3, p. 159–166.

False bedding in stratified drift deposits: American Geologist, v. 13, p. 43–47.

Oscillation and single current ripple marks: American Geologist, v. 13, p. 201–206. Abstract: Minnesota Univ. Quarterly Bulletin, v. 2, p. 54–55.

1895    Economic geology of the Mercur mining district, Utah, (with introduction by S. F. Emmons): U.S. Geological Survey Annual Report 16, pt. 2, p. 343–455.

1896    Gold resources of the Yukon region of Alaska (abstract): Science, new ser., v. 4, p. 801.

1897    The measurement of faults: Journal of Geology, v. 5, p. 723–729. Abstract: Science, new ser., v. 5, p. 238.

1898    Geology of the Yukon gold district, Alaska (with an introductory chapter on the history and         condition of the district to 1897 by Harold Beach Goodrich) : U.S. Geological Survey Annual Report 18, pt, 3, p. 87–392.

Geology of the Aspen mining district, Colorado: U.S. Geological Survey Mon. No. 31. XXXV, 260 p. and atlas.

1899     (Contributions to) Maps and descriptions of routes of explorations in Alaska in 1898: (by G. H. Eldridge, and others): U.S. Geological Survey Annual Report, 138 p.

1900    Quartz-muscovite rock from Belmont, Nevada; the equivalent of the Russian beresite: American Journal of Science, 4th ser., v. 10, p. 351–358.

Ore deposits at Monte Cristo, Washington (abstract); Science, new ser., v. 12, p. 884,885.

Classification of igneous rocks according to composition: American Geologist, v. 25, p. 210–234.

Scapolite rocks from Alaska: American Journal of Science, 4th ser., v. 10, p. 310–315.

A reconnaissance in southwestern Alaska in 1898: U.S. Geological Survey Annual Report 20, pt. 7, p. 31-264.

Succession and relation of lavas in the Great Basin region: Journal of Geology, v. 8, p. 621–646.

Structure of the Basin ranges (abstract): Science, new ser., v. 11, p. 229.

Through the Yukon Gold Diggings; a narrative of personal travel: Boston, Eastern Publishing Co., 276 p.

The Exploration of the Kuskoquim River and the Valley of the Ten Thousand Smokes, privately printed, Boston.

1901    Origin and structure of the Basin ranges: Geological Society of America Bulletin, v. 12, p. 217,270. Abstract: Science, new ser., v. 13, p. 98.

Variations of texture in certain Tertiary igneous rocks of the Great Basin: Journal of Geology, v. 9, p. 586–606.

The ore deposits of Monte Cristo, Washington: U.S. Geological Survey Annual Report 22, pt. 2, p. 777–865. Reviewed by H. V. Winchell in American Geologist, v. 30; p. 113–118 (1902).

1902     The original source of the Lake Superior iron ores: American Geologist, v. 29, p. 335–349.

Application of geology to mining: Mining and Sci. Press, v. 85, p. 145–146.

1903    Descriptive geology of Nevada south of the fortieth parallel and adjacent portions of California: U.S. Geological Survey Bulletin 208, 229 p. (2d ed., 1905).

A consideration of igneous rocks and their segregation or differentiation as related to the occurrence of ores (with discussion by A. N. Winchell): American Institute of Mining Engineers Transactions, v. 33, p. 288–340.

The ore deposits of Tonopah, Nevada (preliminary report): U.S. Geological Survey Bulletin 219, 31 p. Abstract: Engineering and Mining Journal, v. 76, p. 54–55.

(Contributions to) Ore deposits; a discussion by Thomas Arthur Rickard: Engineering and Mining Journal, v. 75, p. 256–258, 476–479, 594–595.

(Contributions to) A genetic classification of ore deposits by Walter H. Weed: Science, new ser., v. 17, p. 273–274.

(Contributions to) The geological features of the gold production of North Amer¬ica, a discussion by Waldemar Lindgren: American Institute of Mining Engineers Transactions, v. 33, p. 790–845, 1081–1083.

The relation of faults to topography (abstract): Science, new ser., v. 17, p. 792.

Ore deposits of Tonopah and neighboring districts, Nevada: U.S. Geological Survey Bulletin 213, p. 81–87.

The ore deposits of Tonopah, Nevada: Engineering and Mining Journal, v. 76, p. 769–770.

Application of geology to mining: 5th International Mining Congress Proceedings, p. 80–86.

The determination of the feldspars in thin section: American Geologist, v. 31, p. 376,383.

Genetic classification of ore deposits (abstract): Science, new ser., v. 17, p. 274.

Relation of rock segregation to ore deposition: Engineering and Mining Journal, v. 76, p. 54–55.

1904    The Silver Peak region, Nevada: Engineering and Mining Journal, v. 77, p. 759–760.

Coal deposits between Silver Peak and Candelaria, Esmeralda County, Nevada: U.S. Geological Survey Bulletin 225, p. 289–292.

Geology applied to mining; a concise summary of the chief geological principles, a knowledge of which is necessary to the understanding and proper exploitation of ore-deposits, for mining men and students, New York: Engineering and Mining Journal, 326 p.

Alum deposit near Silver Peak, Esmeralda County, Nevada: U.S. Geological Survey Bulletin 225, p. 501–502.

Faulting at Tonopah, Nevada (abstract): Science, new ser., v. 19, p. 921–922.

Ore deposits of Silver Peak quadrangle, Nevada: U.S. Geological Survey Bulletin 225, p. 111–117.

Notes on the geology of the Goldfield district, Nevada: U.S. Geological Survey Bulletin 225, p. 118–119.
	
Preliminary report on the ore deposits of Tonopah, Nevada: U.S. Geological Survey Bulletin 225, p. 89–110.

1905    Geology of the Tonopah mining district, Nevada: U.S. Geological Survey Prof. Paper 42, 295 p. Abstract: Engineering and Mining Journal, v. 80, p. 922–923.

Descriptive geology of Nevada south of the fortieth parallel and adjacent portions of California: Mining Report, v. 52, p. 232–233.

(with George H. Garrey) Preliminary report on ore deposits in the Georgetown, Colo¬rado, mining district: U.S. Geological Survey Bulletin 260, p. 99–120.

The ores of Goldfield, Nevada: U.S. Geological Survey Bulletin 260, p. 132–139.

Developments at Tonopah, Nevada, during 1904: U.S. Geological Survey Bulletin 260, p. 140–149.

Tonopah mining district (western Nevada): Franklin Institute Journal, v. 160, p. 1–20.

Enrichment in fissure veins: Engineering and Mining Journal, v. 80, p. 597–598.

Genetic relations of the western Nevada ores: American Institute of Mining Engineers Bimonthly Bulletin 5, p. 939–969.

1906   What is a fissure vein?: Economic Geology, v. 1, p. 282–285.

Genetic relations of the western Nevada ores: American Institute of Mining Engineers Transactions, v. 36, p. 372–402.

Ore deposits of the Silver Peak quadrangle, Nevada: U.S. Geological Survey Prof. Paper 55, 174 pages.

The southern Klondike district, Esmeralda County, Nevada; a study in metalliferous quartz veins of magmatic origin: Economic Geology, v. 1, p. 369–382.

(with George H. Garrey) The Idaho Springs mining district, Colorado: U.S. Geological Survey Bulletin 285, p. 35–40.

1907    How should faults be named and classified?: Economic Geology, v. 2, p. 182–184; p. 601–602.

The Goldfield district, Nevada (abstract): Franklin Institute Journal, v. 164, p. 155–160.

A theory of ore deposition: Economic Geology, v. 2, p. 781–795.

1908    A theory of ore deposition: Mining and Sci. Press, v. 96, p. 261–265, 662–663.

A theory of the origin of ore deposits: Mining World, v. 28, p. 489–490, 519, 660.

(with George H. Garrey) Economic geology of the Georgetown quadrangle (together with the Empire district), Colorado, with general geology by Sydney H. Ball: U.S. Geological Survey Prof. Paper 63, 422 p.

(with George H. Garrey) Ore deposits of the Velardena district, Mexico: Economic Geology, v. 3, p. 688–725.

1909    Ore deposition at Aspen, Colorado: Economic Geology, v. 4, p. 301–320; Mining World, v. 31, p. 749–752.

Scapolite rocks of America: American Journal of Science 4th ser., v. 24, p. 154.

1911    Tonopah geology (Nevada): Mining and Sci. Press, v. 102, p. 560–562.

1912    Theory of ore deposition: Economic Geology, v. 7, p. 485–492.

1913    (with J. E. Garrey and C. N. Fenner) Study of a contact-metamorphic ore deposit, The Dolores Mine, at Matehuala, S.L.P., Mexico: Economic Geology, v. 7, p. 444–484. Abstract: Washington Academy of  Sciences Journal, v. 3, no. 4, p. 116.

Genetic relations of the western Nevada ores (see 1905), in Emmons, S. F., Ore Deposits: New York, American Institute of Mining Engineers, p. 590–620.

A consideration of igneous rocks and their segregation or differentiation as related to the occurrence of ores (see 1903), in Emmons, S. F., Ore Deposits: New York, American Institute of Mining Engineers, p. 251–304.

1915    Geology and ore deposition at Tonopah, Nevada: Economic Geology, v. 10, p. 713–769.

Origin of certain ore deposits (lead and zinc, Mississippi Valley): Economic Geology, v.10, p. 472–475.

1916    The relation of ore deposition to faulting: Economic Geology, v. 11, p. 601–622.

1918    War minerals: Economic Geology, v. 13, p. 500–511.

1919    Commercial control of the mineral resources of the world (abstract): Geological Society of           America Bulletin, v. 30, p. 108–109.

1920   (Editor) Political and commercial geology and the world's mineral resources; a series of       studies by specialists: New York, McGraw-Hill Book Co., 562 p.

The copper ores of Lake Superior: Engineering and Mining Journal, v. 110, p. 355–357.

The origin of iron ores: Engineering and Mining Journal, v. 109, p. 1053.

1922    Origin of desert ranges of Mexico: Pan-American Geologist, v. 37, p. 79.

The zonal theory of ore deposition: Engineering and Mining Journal, v. 113, p. 489.

1923    The ore magmas; a series of essays on ore deposition: New York, McGraw-Hill Book Co., 2 vols., 915 p.

The filling of fissure veins: Engineering and Mining Journal, v. 116, p. 329–330.

The gold ores of Porcupine (Ontario): Engineering and Mining Journal v. 116, p. 633–638.

The pre-Cambrian veins of Kirkland Lake, Ontario: Engineering and Mining Journal, v. 116, p. 671–672.

The origin of metallic concentrations by magmation: Economic Geology, v. 18, p. 617–638.

(Contribution to) Economic application of zonal theory of primary deposition ores (by John Carter Anderson): American Institute of Mining and Metallurgy Engineers Transactions, v. 96, p. 22–35.

(Contributions to) An Arizona asbestos deposit (by Alan M. Bateman): Economic Geo¬logy, v. 18, p. 663–683.

(Contributions to Necrology) Horace Vaughn Winchell (by John P. Gray): Mining and Metallurgy, v. 4, p. 463–464.

1924    The content of metals in intrusive magmas: Economic Geology, v. 19, p. 89–92.

Upper Mississippi lead and zinc ores: Engineering and Mining Journal, v. 118, p. 246–250, 287–292.

(Contributions to) The gold ores of Grass Valley, California (by E. Howe): Economic Geology, v. 19, p. 595–622.

(Necrology) Alfred Hulse Brooks: Engineering and Mining Journal, v. 118, p. 891.

(Contributions to) Angular inclusions and replacement deposits (by Alan M. Bateman) : Economic Geology, v. 19, p. 504–520.

(Contributions to) Primary downward changes in ore deposits (by W. H. Emmons) : American Institute of Mining and Metallurgy Engineers  Transactions, v. 70, p. 964–997.

Ore injection at Edwards, New York: Engineering and Mining Journal, v. 117, p. 684–689.

Ore deposition at the Creighton nickel mine, Sudbury, Ontario: Economic Geology, v. 19, p. 275–280.

Ore magmas (abstract): Canadian Mining Journal, v. 45, p. 1099.

Application of the zonal theory: Engineering and Mining Journal, v. 117, p. 393.

The microscope and the decadence of geology: Engineering and Mining Journal, v. 118, p. 82–83.

1925     (with J. Volney Lewis) Ore deposition at Franklin Furnace, New Jersey: Engineering and           Mining Journal, v. 119, p. 317–328.

(Co-editor with Felix Edgar Wormser) The marketing of metals and minerals; a series of articles by specialists: New York, McGraw-Hill Book Company.

The Camp Bird (Colorado) compound veindike: Economic Geology, v. 20, p. 115–152; Engineering and Mining Journal, v. 119, p. 517–529.

Ore magmas versus magmatic waters: Engineering and Mining Journal, v. 119, p. 890.

Development of the ore magma theory: Engineering and Mining Journal, v. 119, p. 874–875.

The ghost of the molten magma: Engineering and Mining Journal, v. 120, p. 322.

The natural history of the pegmatites: Engineering and Mining Journal, v. 120, p. 402–403.

What is a magma?: Engineering and Mining Journal, v. 120, p. 562.

Mining for shooting stars: Engineering and Mining Journal, v. 120, p. 1001–1002.

Angular inclusions in ore deposits (discussion): Economic Geology, v. 20, p. 766–767.

Basic dike injections in magmatic vein sequences (with discussion by J. F. Kemp): Geological Society of  America Bulletin, v. 36, p. 545–582, (abstract), p. 167. Abstracts reprinted in Pan-American Geologist, v. 43, p. 145, 1927.

1926    Geology applied to mining; a first book of general geology and metallology: New York,           McGraw-Hill Book Co., 361 p.

Review of geology and ore deposits of the Randsburg quadrangle, California (1925) – California State Mining Bur. Bulletin, v. 95, 152 p.; Engineering and Mining Journal, v. 121, p. 463–464.

(Contribution to) Discussion: Magmas, dikes and veins (by W. Lindgren): American Institute of Mining and Metallurgy Engineers Transactions, v. 74, p. 71–126.

Alkaline sulphides as collectors of metals: Engineering and Mining Journal, v. 120, p. 975–977; Bol. Minero, t. 21, no. 1, p. 12–16.

Ore deposits or ore injection: Engineering and Mining Journal, v. 121, p. 475.

Essentials of the ore magma theory: Engineering and Mining Journal, v. 121, p. 634–635.

Formation of Porcupine quartz veins (discussion): Economic Geology, v. 21, p. 95–96.

Magmas, dikes, and veins: Engineering and Mining Journal, v. 122, p. 134–140.

Lead-zinc chimneys in limestone: Engineering and Mining Journal, v. 122, p. 296–298.

Crystallization temperature of veins near the surface (discussion): Economic Geology,
v. 21. p. 619–621.

Successive banding around rock fragments in veins: Economic Geology, v. 21, p. 519–537; Engineering and Mining Journal, v. 122, p. 491–498.

The Kentucky-Illinois ore magmatic district: Engineering and Mining Journal, v. 122, p. 695–699.

The southeast Missouri ore magmatic district: Engineering and Mining Journal, v. 122, p. 968–975.

Ore deposition in the Tri-State district: Engineering and Mining Journal, v. 121, p. 913.

1927    Ores of the Joplin region Pitcher district (Oklahoma): Engineering and Mining Journal, v. 123, p. 199–209.

A feldspar-chalcopyrite rock-ore from Sonora: Engineering and Mining Journal, v. 123, p. 604–605.

Iron ores of Iron Mountain and Pilot Knob: Engineering and Mining Journal, v. 123, p. 363–366.

Dikes and ores of the Mississippi Valley: Engineering and Mining Journal, v. 123, p. 82.

1939    Diaschistic dikes and ore deposits: Economic Geology, v. 34, p. 41.48.

1944    Geology applied to selenology: I. The Imbrian Plain region of the Moon: Lancaster, Pennsylvania, Science Press Pub. Co., 112 p.

1945    Geology applied to selenology: II. The features of the Moon: Lancaster, Pennsylvania, Science Press Pub. Co., 318 p.

1946    Autobiography, unpublished manuscript, 295 p.

1948    Geology applied to selenology: III. Lunar catastrophic history: Concord, New Hampshire, Rumford Press, 253 p.

1949    Geology applied to selenology: IV. The shrunken Moon: Concord, New Hampshire, Rumford Press, 207 p.

1975    Into an unknown country: the recollections and journals of an Alaskan expedition, 
1898: manuscript written in 1928, based on the diaries J.E. Spurr kept during the Kuskokwim expedition, subsequently edited by Ray Naddy, illustrated by Robert Wandesforde, and published in seven parts in Alaska Magazine (May–November 1975).

References
 Books by Josiah Edward Spurr in the University of Washington Libraries
 Southwest Alaska Chapter 3 1867–1912 The Era of American Exploitation Alaska History and Cultural Studies course
 Memorial Resolution William A. Spurr (1905–1975) at Stanford University, in PDF format
 Spurrite mineral data from mindat.org

External links
 
 

1870 births
1950 deaths
American geologists
American explorers
United States Geological Survey personnel
Harvard University alumni
Economic geologists